John Alexander Woyat (February 3, 1933 – September 16, 1998) was a Canadian football player who played for the Edmonton Eskimos. He won the Grey Cup with the Eskimos in 1955 and 1956. Woyat played football previously with the University of Oregon.

References

1933 births
1998 deaths
Edmonton Elks players
Players of Canadian football from British Columbia
Canadian football people from Vancouver
Oregon Ducks football players
Canadian players of American football